Suzun is an urban locality (a work settlement) and the administrative center of Suzunsky District of Novosibirsk Oblast, Russia. Population: 

Suzun is also known for the mint that operated there during the reign of Catherine II, up until that of Nicholas I, producing copper coinage for the Siberian region.

Etymology 
Suzun is named after the Suzun River,[ru] a tributary of the Ob River that flows through the town.

References

Urban-type settlements in Novosibirsk Oblast